The sweet spot is a place where a combination of factors results in a maximum response for a given amount of effort. In tennis, squash, racquetball, baseball, cricket or golf a given swing will result in a more powerful hit if the ball strikes the racket, bat or club on the latter's sweet spot. 

The sweet spot is the location at which the object being struck, usually a ball, absorbs the maximum amount of the available forward momentum and rebounds away from the racket, bat, club, etc. with a greater velocity than if struck at any other point on the racket, bat or club.  

In endurance sports such as cycling, sweet spot training aims to maximise training benefit (generally for performance at or near FTP, or Functional Threshold Power) by optimally balancing training effect, physiological strain and maximum duration.

See also
 Center of percussion

References

Baseball terminology
Cricket terminology
Sports terminology
Tennis terminology